A Rhinoscope (or Nasoscope) is a thin, tube-like instrument used to examine the inside of the nose. A rhinoscope has a light and a lens for viewing and may have a tool to remove tissue.

Types

Rhinoscopy is performed by two procedures.
 Anterior Rhinoscopy using a nasal speculum
 Posterior Rhinoscopy using an endoscopic rhinoscope

Anterior Rhinoscopy

In anterior rhinoscopy, the rhinoscope is advanced through the nose to examine the nasal cavity.

Posterior Rhinoscopy

In posterior rhinoscopy, the endoscope is advanced through the mouth to examine the back of the nasal cavity above the soft palate, and can be used to visualise the oropharynx below that.

structures seen in posterior Rhinoscopy -posterior border of nasal septum, fossa of roosenmuller, eustachian tube opening, upper surface of soft palate.

References

"Rhinoscopy", The College of Veterinary Medicine/UT, retrieved Feb. 2013.

External links 
 Rhinoscope entry in the public domain NCI Dictionary of Cancer Terms

Medical equipment
Optical instruments
Rhinology